Captain Gwilym Puw (sometimes anglicised as William Pugh) (c. 1618 – c. 1689) was a Welsh Catholic and Cavalier poet and Royalist officer from a prominent Recusant family from the Creuddyn Peninsula in north Wales.

He was a prolific author of Welsh language poems, mainly in defence of the Catholic faith. He also translated Catholic liturgical works from Ecclesiastical Latin into his native Welsh.

In 1648 he composed a Welsh poem in which loyalty to King Charles I is combined with devotion to the Roman Catholic Church. He begins by saying that the political evils afflicting Britain are God's punishment for the abandonment of the "true religion". People were far happier, he proceeds, when the 'Old Faith' prevailed. But a better time is coming. The English Roundheads will be made square by a crushing defeat, and the king will return "under a golden veil"; the Mass shall be sung once more, and a bishop shall elevate the host. Here we have evidently a mystical allusion to the King of Kings on His throne in the tabernacle, and this is the theme underlying the whole poem.

This article incorporates text from The Catholic Encyclopedia, Volume XV Copyright © 1912, which is in the public domain.

1610s births
1680s deaths
17th-century Welsh writers
17th-century male writers
17th-century Welsh poets
Translators from Latin
Translators to Welsh
Welsh-language poets
Welsh Roman Catholics
Welsh Catholic poets